The 2002 CONCACAF Champions' Cup, also known as the 2002 FC Champions Cup, was the 37th edition of the annual international club football competition held in the CONCACAF region (North America, Central America and the Caribbean), the CONCACAF Champions' Cup. It featured a league format with 16 clubs. As part of the expansion, the quarterfinal stage for the current Champions Cup was moved to the first months of the 2002. Those clubs that had already qualified for the quarterfinal stage of the 2001 CONCACAF Champions' Cup were moved directly into the new league format.

To facilitate the shift to the new cycle of qualifying rounds in the latter half of one year and the league stage in the first half of the following, the decision was taken to use the current competition as the transition period and fold those clubs already qualified into the league format.

In addition, the winner and runner-up of the 2001 CONCACAF Giants Cup (Club América and D.C. United) was also merged into the first edition to provide both of those clubs the opportunity to compete for a spot in the 2003 FIFA Club World Championship, as they would have done under the previous competition system. This was convenient, as one of the qualifying MLS teams, Miami Fusion F.C., was folded after the 2001 season despite winning the MLS Supporters' Shield that year.

Club Comunicaciones, Tauro FC and Alajuelense, were elected as the top Central American non-qualifiers for the 2001 CONCACAF Champions Cup and finally the 2001 MLS Cup champions San Jose Earthquakes and the Mexican 2001 Invierno season champions Pachuca. Originally, 4 groups of 4 teams each, to be drawn in December or January, were planned, but at the end of November, CONCACAF changed plans once again and decided to play the tournament in a two-legs knock-out format, without a group stage. Because of this, the tournament's name was changed from CONCACAF Champions League back to CONCACAF Champions Cup.

The two finalists were supposed to qualify for the cancelled 2003 FIFA World Club Championship. Mexican club Pachuca beat countryfellow Morelia 1–0 in the final to win their first CONCACAF trophy.

Qualified teams

North American zone
 Morelia – 2000 Invierno champion
 Pachuca – 2001 Invierno champion
 Santos Laguna – 2001 Verano champion
 Club América – 2001 Giants Cup champion
 Kansas City Wizards – 2000 MLS Cup champion and 2000 MLS Supporters' Shield winner
 Chicago Fire – 2000 MLS Cup runner-up
 San Jose Earthquakes – 2001 MLS Cup champion
 D.C. United – 2001 Giants Cup runner-up

Central American zone
 Municipal – UNCAF champion
 Saprissa – UNCAF runner-up
 Olimpia – UNCAF third place
 Comunicaciones – UNCAF fourth place
 Tauro – UNCAF semifinal qualifier
 Alajuelense – UNCAF semifinal qualifier

Caribbean zone
 Defence Force – 2001 CFU Club Championship finalist
 W Connection – 2001 CFU Club Championship finalist

Bracket

First round
First leg and Second leg matches were played between February 3, 2002 and March 27, 2002.

|}

Advancing clubs: Alajuelense Comunicaciones Pachuca San Jose Earthquakes Monarcas Morelia Chicago Fire Santos Laguna Kansas City Wizards

Quarterfinals
First leg and Second leg matches were played between April 14, 2002 and April 24, 2002.

|}
|}

Advancing clubs: LD Alajuelense C.F. Pachuca Morelia Kansas City Wizards

Semifinals
First leg and Second leg matches were played between August 7, 2002 and August 28, 2002.

|}
|}

Advancing clubs: Pachuca Morelia

Final

Champions

Top scorers

References

CONCACAF Champions' Cup
c
c